Frank Stephen Bunn (born 6 November 1962) is an English former professional footballer who is the U23 coach of League One club Wigan Athletic. He holds the Football League Cup record for the most goals (six) by a player in a single match, achieved in 1989.

Career
Bunn played as a striker and began his career at Luton Town, and later played for Hull City and Oldham Athletic. His most famous moment as a player came on 25 October 1989, when he scored six goals in Oldham's 7–0 victory over Scarborough in the third round of the League Cup, which is still the League Cup record for most goals by a player in a single match.

In 1990, Bunn was forced to retire from professional football because of injury. He then joined Stalybridge Celtic and later Radcliffe Borough. He later became a coach and began his coaching career at Wigan Athletic, before joining Manchester City as reserve team coach in 1998. In February 2007, Bunn was appointed first-team coach at Coventry City, and on 11 February 2008, he was named joint caretaker manager along with John Harbin, following the dismissal of Iain Dowie. He returned to his old position as first-team coach following Chris Coleman's appointment as manager on 19 February 2008. He left the club in May 2010 after his contract expired.

In June 2011, Bunn was appointed as Steve Eyre's assistant manager at Rochdale. In July 2012, he joined Huddersfield Town as a professional development coach working with the academy under-18 team.

Bunn was appointed manager of newly relegated League Two club Oldham Athletic on 13 June 2018 on a one-year contract, but sacked the following December.

In July 2019, he joined Wigan Athletic and as of the 2020–21 season is the coach of their U23 side.

Personal life
Bunn's son, Harry Bunn, is a professional footballer.

Managerial statistics

References

External links
Career statistics

1962 births
Living people
Footballers from Birmingham, West Midlands
English footballers
Association football forwards
Luton Town F.C. players
Hull City A.F.C. players
Oldham Athletic A.F.C. players
Stalybridge Celtic F.C. players
Radcliffe F.C. players
English Football League players
English football managers
Coventry City F.C. managers
Oldham Athletic A.F.C. managers
English Football League managers
Manchester City F.C. non-playing staff
Coventry City F.C. non-playing staff
Rochdale A.F.C. non-playing staff
Huddersfield Town A.F.C. non-playing staff
Wigan Athletic F.C. non-playing staff